For the Young, and the Young At Heart is the eleventh Sons of the San Joaquin album.  It was the first to be independently produced and distributed since 1998's Christmas.

Track listing

Personnel

Sons of the San Joaquin

Jack Hannah
Joe Hannah
Lon Hannah

Additional personnel

Mike Dana - guitar
Jeff Hall - guitar, percussion
Richard Chon - fiddle
Tim Johnson - fiddle
Dennis Mack - bass
Eddie Gordon - harmonica

Production

Sons of the San Joaquin - executive producers
Russ Pate - album concept and coordination
Recorded at: 
Maximus Recording Studios, Fresno, CA
Jeff Hall - engineer
Eric Sherbon - engineer
Ray Settle - second engineer
Mastered at:
Capitol Mastering, Hollywood, CA
Robert Vosgien - mastering
David Martin Graham - photography

External links
Official site

2005 albums
Sons of the San Joaquin albums